Kyi dynasty, also known as the Kyivites are a semi-legendary dynasty of early medieval Polans rulers of Kyiv. Hypothetically, Kyivites ruled the glades from the second third of the V century turning it to the Rus Khaganate by 838. The first representatives of this dynasty in Polians were the legendary founders of Kyiv Kyi, Shchek, Khoryv and their sister Lybid. The name of the family came from the name of the eldest of the brothers.

The last hypothetical representative of the Kyi dynasty, Askold-Mykola, was killed in 882 by Vikings led by Oleg. In addition to the aforementioned Askold, his predecessor or contemporary, Dir, also belonged to the dynasty. Currently, limited sources do not give grounds for a final solution to the question of the dynasty's historicity and belonging to it as Prince Askold and his possible predecessor Dir.

Etymology 
The etymology of the anthroponym Kyi, after which the dynasty is named, is quite confidently associated with the Iranian languages:Kyi < іран. Kūya < авест. *kaoya.

Several hypotheses have been made about Kyi and the dynasty he founded. According to the most common Kyi was a Slavic prince of the V-VI centuries, his descendants - the leaders of the East Slavic tribe Polyany.

M. Braychevskyi's hypothesis 
M. Braichevsky's hypothesis is based on the rather popular in Soviet science identification of Kyi with Quar Zenob Glack and Kuver Byzantine chronicles.

The dating of Kyi's life and activity will be acceptable, as will the identification of Kyi with Quar. Kuver's connection with Kyiv is doubtful, the former is now mostly associated with the Proto-Bulgarians.

Khorezmian hypothesis of V. Toporov 
V. Toporov, without directly touching on the topic of the Kyivych dynasty, presented his own hypothesis about the origin of the toponym "Kyiv" (currently actively supported by O. Pritsak), namely:

That is, according to V. Toporov, the Kyiv dynasty did not exist, the name of Kyiv comes from the name of the leader of the Khorezmian army, which was in the service of the Khazars.

The author is not the author of the statement, and the fact that he propounded the hypothesis of entering into confusion with explicit epigraphic materials (see Kuar, Meltei and Chorean "History of Taron"). Respect for those who would be suitable for absolutely overwhelming archaeological memorials was repeated several times. I sing the supernaturalness of the wikipedia and the fact that Oleg Vischy, having buried himself Kyiv (for the writings), was not a "town", which will be named after the Khorezm chiller. Navi the warriors of the Varangians in Kyiv (not earlier than 930 years old), for the purpose of the person of the father Aḥmadu 'bnu Kūyah, of all the times of the age of Kyiv Toporova, information Al Masudi zamalo, tim more hypothesis was involved in being a kind of sensation, as a pretext about the emergence of a Khorezmian vіyska among the khozars close to the IX–X centuries know about the confirmation.

Kyi dynasty in Hypatian Codex 
«And according to these brothers, their family began to hold the reign in the glades.»

Kyi dynasty in Jan Długosz 
«Later, after the deaths of Kyi, Shchek and Khoryv, their sons and descendants inherited from the Rus for many years, until such an inheritance led to two brothers - Oskald and Dir.»

References

Further reading 

 Брайчевський М. Ю. Вибране. Т. II: Хозарія і Русь. Аскольд — цар київський. К.: Вид. ім. Олени Теліги, 2009.
 Голб Н., Прицак О. Хазаро-еврейские документы X в. Москва-Иерусалим, 1997.
 Топоров В. Н. Об иранском элементе в русской духовной культуре. Славянский и балканский фольклор. М.: «Наука», 1989
 Свод древнейших письменных известий о славянах. Т. ІІ. М., 1995.

External links 

 Літопис руський: За Іпатським списком (пер. Л. Махновця). К., Дніпро, 1989.
 (рос.)ЯН ДЛУГОШ. АННАЛЫ ИЛИ ХРОНИКИ СЛАВНОГО КОРОЛЕВСТВА ПОЛЬШИ.
Ukrainian genealogy